Ahmet Gündüz Ökçün (1935 – 26 November 1986) was a Turkish academic, diplomat and the former Minister of Foreign Affairs of Turkey.

Biography
Ahmet Gündüz Ökçün was born in 1935 in Eskişehir, Turkey. He graduated from Faculty of Political Sciences of Ankara University. He served in the same faculty as an academic and later as a dean. He was married and a father of two. He died on 26 November 1986.

Political career

Ökçün joined the Republican People's Party (CHP), and was elected as a deputy in the general election held on 5 June 1977 from Eskişehir Province. He was appointed as the Minister of Foreign Affairs on 21 June 1977 in the 40th government. As the government failed to receive the vote of confidence, his mission in the ministry ended into just one month. However, the 42nd government of Turkey in the next year, which could receive the vote of confidence, he was able to resume the same post, and served between 5 January 1978 and 12 November 1979.

References

1935 births
1986 deaths
People from Eskişehir
Ankara University Faculty of Political Sciences alumni
Academic staff of Ankara University
Republican People's Party (Turkey) politicians
Members of the 16th Parliament of Turkey
Members of the 40th government of Turkey
Members of the 42nd government of Turkey
Ministers of Foreign Affairs of Turkey